Caby is a surname. Notable people with the surname include:

Adèle Caby-Livannah (born 1957), Congolese writer
Auguste Caby (1887–?), French Olympic swimmer
Robert Caby (1905–1992), French composer and writer
Taylor Caby (born 1983), American poker player and entrepreneur